Warraich or Waraich is a clan of Jatts both in Pakistan and India, mainly located in Punjab, Pakistan and Punjab, India.

Notable people
Notable people with the surname, who may or may not be affiliated with the clan, include:
Chaudhary Pervaiz Elahi Warraich, Chief Minister of Punjab, Pakistan
Aman Ullah Warraich, Pakistani politician 
Bilal Asghar Warraich, Pakistani politician 
Chaudhry Arshad Javaid Warraich, Pakistani politician 
Chaudhry Muhammad Ashraf Warraich, Pakistani politician 
Farrukh Shahbaz Warraich, Journalist 
Gul Nawaz Warraich, Pakistani politician 
Imtiaz Safdar Warraich, Pakistani politician
Jagdev Singh Waraich, former Indian athlete
Javed Iqbal Warraich, Pakistani politician
Kabir Waraich, Indian racing driver 
Moin Nawaz Warraich, Pakistani politician 
Muhammad Abdullah Warraich, Pakistani politician 
Suhail Warraich, Pakistani journalist
Zawar Hussain Warraich, Pakistani politician
Desan Kaur Warraich, regent of the Sukerchakia Misl and grandmother of Maharaja Ranjit Singh
Gurpreet Ghuggi Warraich, Indian actor and comedian
Prem Kaur, wife of Maharaja Sher Singhh

References

Warraich
Warraich
Punjabi-language surnames
Jat clans of Punjab
Pakistani names
Indian names